Mohsenabad (also Romanized as Moḩsenābād; also known as Moḩsenābād-e Pā’īn) is a village in Dehgah Rural District, Kiashahr District, Astaneh-ye Ashrafiyeh County, Gilan Province, Iran. At the 2006 census, its population was 715, in 221 families.

References 

Populated places in Astaneh-ye Ashrafiyeh County